Falguni may refer to:

Falguni (given name)
Sailajananda Falguni Smriti Mahavidyalaya, a college in West Bengal, India
Uttar Falguni, a 1963 Bengali drama film